Nare Diawara (born 22 January 1983, in Bamako) is a Malian professional women's basketball center, formerly with the WNBA's San Antonio Stars. Diawara was drafted in the third round (30th overall) of the 2007 WNBA Draft. She played collegiately at Virginia Tech, US.  She is the sister of Diéné Diawara and Lamine Diawara.

Virginia Tech statistics

Source

References

External links
 Profile at wnba.com

1983 births
Living people
Centers (basketball)
Malian expatriate basketball people in the United States
Malian expatriates in the United States
Malian women's basketball players
Sportspeople from Bamako
San Antonio Silver Stars draft picks
San Antonio Stars players
Virginia Tech Hokies women's basketball players
21st-century Malian people